Joni Amelia Fuller is an English singer/songwriter, pianist, violinist and composer from Lancashire. She is the founder of Your Strings Attached.

Her debut album, Voices, recorded in October 2006, contained 12 of her original songs.

Fuller scored two successive wins in the UK's national Make it Break it Songwriting Contest (2008 and 2009) with her songs "America" and "Change Girl".

Early years
Fuller persuaded her parents to buy her a violin for her 5th birthday. Aged 8, she was accepted into the Junior School at the Royal Northern College of Music (first study violin; second study piano) where she achieved ABRSM Grade 8 in both instruments. Fuller began writing her own songs when she was 8 years old.

Fuller performed extensively, developing a trade-mark high energy, instrument swapping performance style that showcased her abilities as a songwriter, singer, pianist, violinist, bassist and guitarist. Aged 12, she performed solo at the Casino Barriere during the Montreux Jazz Festival. Other venues included: Théâtre de Vaudeville (Brussels), Madinat Jumeirah (Dubai) and the Lido Theatre (Paris). Fuller opened two nights during Phil Collins' 'First Final Farewell Tour' at the LTU Arena in Düsseldorf. Aged 14, Fuller was the UK's entrant to the Junior Eurovision Song Contest in 2005 with her song 'How Does it Feel?'.

2007–2015
In 2007, Fuller was awarded 'Le Prix du Merite Artistique' at the LDF awards ceremony in Lausanne and the 'Besso Memorial Prize for Pianoforte' by the Associated Board of the Royal Schools of Music. She performed at the Olympic Stadium in Lausanne during Athletissima 2007. She also performed at the World Conference on Giftedness.

In 2008, Fuller concentrated on live performances in the UK. She received a standing ovation at the Montrose Music Festival and in August, was chosen by the Performing Rights Society to front a media campaign to highlight the importance of performance royalties in supporting young songwriters.

In October 2008, Fuller's song "America" was chosen by a panel of judges that included Chris Martin (Coldplay) as a winner in the Make it Break it Songwriting Contest. In 2009, Fuller scored a second win in the annual MIBI Songwriting Contest with "Change Girl". Later that year, Fuller was featured in The Independent newspaper as an "inspirational teenager".

In 2010, Fuller was awarded "Best Female Artist" at the Exposure Music Awards and featured as "one to watch" by PRS for Music in their on-line magazine M.

2011 and 2012 saw Fuller continue to develop her live shows with performances in London (Ronnie Scott's, The Bedford, The Elgin) and a return to Athletissima in Lausanne, alongside headline performances at Mo-Fest and the Arundel Festival.

During 2014, Fuller launched a new solo acoustic live show, using a loop pedal and swapping instruments live on stage. Fuller recorded a four track EP, 'Letters From The West Coast' in Spring 2015 and embarked on a busy schedule of live shows. In May 2015, Fuller was the only solo artist to reach Indie Week Europe's Final Showcase at The Ruby Lounge, Manchester.

2015 onwards 
In 2015, Fuller launched Your Strings Attached, an online session music service. Her arrangements and performances have been used in film, TV and album releases. In 2017, she composed the full score for indie horror film The Black Gloves, and became a composer and sample developer for California-based Outlier Studios.

Recordings
Fuller wrote all 12 songs for her debut album, Voices.

Track list
 Voices
 I Take a Step Away
 Sail Away
 How Does it Feel?
 Over in a Minute
 So Much to Say
 Fairy Tales
 Finding My Way
 I Guess That's How it Goes
 Little Child
 Search Beyond the Moon
 After the Tide

Fuller also wrote all the songs on her 2009 EP Run for Cover.

 Wait until the Morning Comes
 Run for Cover
 America
 Face Down
 Change Girl
 Paper Cuts

Fuller wrote, performed and produced Letters From The West Coast in 2015.

 The Penny
 Wild Wild West
 Real Love
 Letter To Myself

References

External links

1991 births
Living people
English child singers
English violinists
English women singer-songwriters
English pianists
Junior Eurovision Song Contest entrants
Place of birth missing (living people)
Alumni of the Royal Northern College of Music
21st-century English women singers
21st-century English singers
21st-century pianists
21st-century violinists
21st-century women pianists